Stranger in Town may refer to:

Film and television
Stranger in Town (1931 film), directed by Erle C. Kenton
A Stranger in Town (1943 film), directed by Roy Rowland
Stranger in Town (1957 film), British crime film directed by George Pollock
A Stranger in Town (1967 film), American title of the Tony Anthony spaghetti western Un dollaro tra i denti
"Stranger in Town" (In the Heat of the Night), episode of the American TV series In the Heat of the Night

Music
Stranger in Town (album), 1978 album by Bob Seger
"A Stranger in Town", Mort Greene/Leigh Harline song sung by Burl Ives in the 1948 film Station West
"Stranger in Town", 1961 song by Mel Tormé on his album My Kind of Music
""Stranger in Town" (Del Shannon song), 1965 single by Del Shannon
"Stranger in Town" (Toto song), a song on the 1984 album Isolation
"Stranger in Town", song on the 1991 Pat Metheny Group album We Live Here

See also
Stranger in This Town, 1991 album by Richie Sambora